Daniell and Beutell was an architectural firm in Atlanta during 1919 to 1941.  It was a partnership of Sydney S. Daniell and Russell L. Beutell (1891-1943).  They designed various government buildings, theaters, and residences.  During the 1930s they focused on design of schools and health clinics.

Their work includes buildings listed on the National Register of Historic Places.

Their office was in the Healey Building.

Work
Works by the firm or by either architect include:
Gordon Avenue Apartments (1929), an upscale Tudor Revival apartment building at 424 Gordon Avenue in Thomasville, Georgia, (Daniell & Beutell), NRHP-listed
Joe M. Beutell House (1930), 101 Montrose Dr. Thomasville, GA (Beutell, Russell L.), NRHP-listed  Tudor Revival.
Hall County Courthouse, jct. of Spring and Green Sts. Gainesville, Georgia (Daniell & Beutell), NRHP-listed
Hartwell City School, College Ave. Hartwell, Georgia (Daniel & Beutell), NRHP-listed
Manchester Community Building, 105 E 2nd Ave. Manchester, Georgia (Daniell and Beutell), NRHP-listed
Monroe City Hall, 227 S. Broad St. Monroe, Georgia (Daniel & Beutell), NRHP-listed
SOWEGA Building, 100 S. Hutchinson Ave. Adel, Georgia (Daniel & Beutell), NRHP-listed
Gainesville City Hall, Gainesville, Georgia
a bus station, Atlanta
Tuberculosis Sanatorium, Alto, Georgia
Buckhead Theatre (1930), 3110 Roswell Road, Buckhead Village, Buckhead, Atlanta, Georgia
Grand Theatre (1910), Cartersville, Georgia
Madison Theater (1927), 496 Flat Shoals Avenue, Atlanta (Daniel & Beutell)

Photos of works

References

Architects from Georgia (U.S. state)
Architecture firms of the United States